Thicker than Water may refer to:
Blood is thicker than water, a proverb

Film 
 Thicker than Water (1935 film), a Laurel and Hardy film
 Thicker than Water (1993 film), a television film
 Thicker than Water (1999 film), a drama starring several American rappers
 Thicker than Water (2000 film), a surf film by Jack Johnson and Chris Malloy
 Thicker than Water (2005 film), a television film starring Melissa Gilbert and Lindsay Wagner
 Thicker than Water (2006 film) or Blóðbönd, an Icelandic film

Music 
 Thicker than Water (album), a 1997 album by 
 Thicker than Water (soundtrack), a soundtrack album from the 1999 film
 Thicker than Water, a soundtrack album from the 2000 film
 "(Love Is) Thicker Than Water", a 1977 song by Andy Gibb

Television 
 Thicker than Water (1973 TV series), a U.S. sitcom based on the UK sitcom Nearest and Dearest
 Thicker Than Water (2013 TV series), an American reality television series
 Thicker Than Water (2014 TV series), a Swedish drama about three siblings who inherit a guesthouse
 "Thicker than Water" (Charlie Jade), an episode of Charlie Jade
 "Thicker than Water" (Only Fools and Horses), an episode of Only Fools and Horses
 Thicker Than Water (Under the Dome), an episode of Under the Dome
 Thicker than Water (audio drama), a 2005 audio drama based on Doctor Who "Thicker Than Water", an episode of Keeping Up with the Kardashians''

See also
 Blood Is Thicker than Water (disambiguation)